John Thomas Eversole (April 17, 1915 – June 4, 1942) graduated from the United States Naval Academy in 1938, and after duty at sea received aviation training. Lieutenant (junior grade) Eversole's determination in this action was posthumously recognized with the award of the Navy Cross.

On February 18, 1942, Eversole had to ditch his TBD Devastator torpedo bomber sixty miles from the Enterprise, after he became disoriented and ran out of fuel. He was successfully picked up by one of his Task Forces destroyers the next day.

Namesake
The destroyer escort  was the first ship named in his honor. She was sunk during The Battle of Leyte Gulf on March 21, 1944. In 1946 a second ship, the destroyer  was named in his honor.

See also

References

External links
LtJg John Thomas Eversole at Find a Grave

1915 births
1942 deaths
United States Navy officers
United States Naval Academy alumni
Recipients of the Navy Cross (United States)
United States Navy personnel killed in World War II
People from Pocatello, Idaho